Brad Schimel (born February 18, 1965) is an American prosecutor and judge. He was the 44th Attorney General of Wisconsin, serving from 2015 to 2019. He was defeated seeking re-election in 2018, and was subsequently appointed Wisconsin Circuit Court Judge in Waukesha County, Wisconsin, by Governor Scott Walker. Prior to winning election as Attorney General, Schimel was district attorney of Waukesha County.

Early life and education
Schimel is a graduate of Mukwonago High School, and holds a B.A. in political science from the University of Wisconsin–Milwaukee (1987). He earned his Juris Doctor at the University of Wisconsin Law School in 1990.

Legal career
He began his career as a prosecutor in 1990, when he joined the Waukesha County District Attorney's office. In 2006 Schimel was elected Waukesha County District Attorney.  He would be re-elected without opposition in 2008, 2010, and 2012.

In 2011, Schimel was appointed to serve on the Wisconsin Judicial Council and the Wisconsin Crime Victim Council.

Schimel is an instructor in the Law Enforcement and Criminal Justice Department at Waukesha County Technical College, and is a former adjunct instructor at Concordia University Wisconsin.

Attorney General of Wisconsin
On October 7, 2013, Van Hollen announced he would not seek reelection in 2014 for a third term as state attorney general. Van Hollen endorsed Schimel as his replacement. In the 2014 general election, Schimel defeated opponent Susan Happ.

As Wisconsin Attorney General, Schimel appealed the ruling by a federal judge in the United States District Court for the Eastern District of Wisconsin that Brendan Dassey, one of the subjects of Making a Murderer, had been coerced into confessing to a murder as an intellectually disabled 16-year old. Courts subsequently ruled either to free Dassey or block his release pending a new trial. Schimel argued that the United States Supreme Court should not hear Dassey's case; when the U.S. Supreme Court declined hearing Dassey's case, Schimel said he was pleased.

Schimel also defended systemic gerrymandering by the state's Republican legislature, which resulted in Republicans controlling 64% of the legislative seats although the state is almost equally divided in the popular vote. The U.S. Court of Appeals for the Seventh Circuit rejected the state's most recent redistricting plan. Schimel petitioned the U.S. Supreme Court in 2017 to overturn that decision. In Gill v. Whitford (2019), the U.S. Supreme Court sided with Wisconsin Republicans, allowing partisan gerrymandering to continue.

Career as state judge
In November 2018, after Schimel was defeated for reelection by Democratic candidate Josh Kaul, Republican Governor Scott Walker (who had lost his own re-election bid to Democratic candidate Tony Evers) appointed Schmiel to the Waukesha County Circuit Court. The state Democratic Party criticized the appointment. Walker announced the appointment the day after Schimel conceded to Kaul. Walker passed over 13 applicants for the position to appoint Schimel; it is unclear whether Schimel submitted a formal application for the judicial vacancy. Schimel had submitted letters of recommendation for four other applicants for the job, including one of his campaign coordinators.

In October 2020, Schimel was an emcee at an Ozaukee County Republican Party fundraising event, alongside Ron Johnson and other Republican elected officials. This prompted criticism because Wisconsin state law states that judges must refrain from engaging in partisan political activity. Schimel defended his appearance at the event. Schmiel also attended a Donald Trump rally at the Waukesha County Airport later that month, although he "emphasized he was attending the rally as an individual and Trump supporter."

During the COVID-19 pandemic, Schimel initially refused to wear a face covering while presiding in court, defying a statewide state court directive requiring the use of face coverings during in-person proceedings, as a measure to prevent the transmission of COVID-19. After public defenders complained for months that Schimel's actions were putting litigants and counsel at risk, Schmiel was reprimanded by the chief judge of the 3rd Judicial District. Chief Justice Patience Roggensack of the Wisconsin Supreme Court, who is the head of the Wisconsin state court system, barred Schimel from presiding over cases in person due to his refusal to wear a face covering (or hold proceedings all remotely via videoconference). The ban was lifted after Schimel agreed to wear a face covering in court.

Electoral history

Waukesha District Attorney (2006, 2008, 2010, 2012)

| colspan="6" style="text-align:center;background-color: #e9e9e9;"| Primary Election, September 12, 2006

| colspan="6" style="text-align:center;background-color: #e9e9e9;"| General Election, November 7, 2006

| colspan="6" style="text-align:center;background-color: #e9e9e9;"| General Election, November 4, 2008

| colspan="6" style="text-align:center;background-color: #e9e9e9;"| General Election, November 2, 2010

| colspan="6" style="text-align:center;background-color: #e9e9e9;"| General Election, November 6, 2012

Wisconsin Attorney General (2014, 2018)

| colspan="6" style="text-align:center;background-color: #e9e9e9;"| Primary Election, August 12, 2014

| colspan="6" style="text-align:center;background-color: #e9e9e9;"| General Election, November 4, 2014

| colspan="6" style="text-align:center;background-color: #e9e9e9;"| Primary Election, August 14, 2018

| colspan="6" style="text-align:center;background-color: #e9e9e9;"| General Election, November 6, 2018

References

External links
 Wisconsin Attorney General's Office
 Schimel's campaign website

1965 births
21st-century American politicians
District attorneys in Wisconsin
Living people
People from Waukesha County, Wisconsin
University of Wisconsin–Milwaukee alumni
University of Wisconsin Law School alumni
Wisconsin Attorneys General
Wisconsin Republicans
Wisconsin state court judges